Fantastic Voyage is a 1966 science fiction film starring Stephen Boyd and Raquel Welch and novelized by Isaac Asimov

Fantastic Voyage may also refer to:

 Fantastic Voyage (TV series), an animated series spun off from the film
 Fantastic Voyage II: Destination Brain, a 1987 science fiction novel by Isaac Asimov
 "Fantastic Voyage" (David Bowie song), 1979
 "Fantastic Voyage" (Lakeside song), 1980
 "Fantastic Voyage" (Coolio song), 1994
 Fantastic Voyage (album), a 1980 album by Lakeside
 Fantastic Voyage: The Greatest Hits, a 2001 compilation album by rapper Coolio
 Fantastic Voyage: Live Long Enough to Live Forever, a 2004 non-fiction book by Ray Kurzweil and Terry Grossman
 , a video game developed by Quicksilva and released in 1984.
 Fantastic Voyage, a video game for Amiga, developed by Centaur and released in 1991.

See also 
 Fantastic Journey (disambiguation)
Voyages extraordinaires, a series of science fiction novels of Jules Verne